AFM Solaiman Chowdhury is a Former civil servant in Bangladesh. He is a former chairman of the National Board of Revenue. Prior to that, he was the Secretary, Ministry of Textiles and Jute.

Early life 
AFM Solaiman Chowdhury was born on 1 January 1950 in Comilla District. His father was Abdul Jabbar and mother was Shah Banu.

Education 

 SSC from   Begumganj Government Pilot High School in 1966
 HSC  As Private Student Board of Intermediate and Secondary Education, Comilla 1972
 BA from University of Chittagong in 1975
 MBA from University of Science and Technology Chittagong

Career 
Teacher at  Bholain Bazar High School And College, Nangolkot .

Lakshmanpur Nurul Huq High School, Monohorgonj. 

AKBARIA SCHOOL & COLLEGE, Hathazari 

AFM Solaiman Chowdhury is a member of Bangladesh Administrative Service and Bangladesh Civil Service regular batch and has served important positions in field administration. Joining the government service, he has held various responsibilities including Chief executive officer Dhaka City Corporation, Secretary of  Chittagong City Corporation, Chairman of Bangladesh Jute Mills Corporation, Chairman of Chittagong WASA, Chairman of Janata Bank, Chairman of Bangladesh Petroleum Corporation, Secretary to the President of Bangladesh.

He was the Deputy Commissioner of Kurigram DistrictFeni District. After 2006, he retired as Secretary to the Ministry of Public Administration and most recently as Chairman of the National Board of Revenue. After retiring from the post of secretary, he rejoined Jamaat-e-Islami in 2009.

He was a member of the Shura in Jamaat-e-Islami and was the chairman of the National Professional Forum, an organization of party professionals. After retiring from the post of secretary, he joined Jamaat-e-Islami. On 10 December 2019, he resigned from Bangladesh Jamaat-e-Islami.

He was announced as the convener of a new political party called 'Amar Bangladesh Party' (AB Party) which was launched on 2 May 2020.

References 

Living people
1950 births
People from Comilla District
University of Chittagong alumni
Bangladeshi civil servants
Bangladesh Jamaat-e-Islami politicians